In order to contain the violence in the Dutch East Indies after the Japanese capitulation in 1945 and to restore colonial order, the Netherlands sent battalions of Oorlogsvrijwilligers (OVWs) to the colony. They were recruited in 1944 and 1945, mostly in the southern provinces of the Netherlands, and initially intended for deployment in Europe. Others had signed up for the fight against Japan in the summer of 1945.

The emergency situation in the East Indies prompted the Schermerhorn–Drees cabinet to send the Dutch military overseas. They arrived in British Malacca in November 1945. The British authorities, who temporarily exercised authority in the Dutch East Indies after the war in Asia, refused to admit the Dutch troops there. They feared that this would escalate the already tense political situation. The fact that there was little international sympathy for the Dutch efforts to restore colonial authority in Indonesia may also have been a factor. It was not until late February 1946 that the Oorlogsvrijwilligers were admitted and took over the positions of the British. They were stationed in enclaves around a number of large cities on Java and Sumatra.

In total, approximately 25,000 OVW personnel would go to the East Indies, of which 5,000 to 6,000 were assigned to the Mariniersbrigade and the rest to the Royal Army. Five brigades were formed from this last group, the staffs of which were manned by officers from the Royal Netherlands East Indies Army. To the numbers mentioned must be added several thousand OVW personnel who served on ships of the Royal Navy and with the Netherlands Naval Aviation Service in the Dutch East Indies. Later, the Oorlogsvrijwilligers were supplanted by much larger numbers of Dutch conscripts.

From the very beginning of their presence in the East Indies, the OVWs were involved in combat operations. The Indonesian nationalists did not accept the renewed military presence of the Dutch and responded with armed actions against the Dutch enclaves. More large-scale military action by the OVWs came during Operation Product in the summer of 1947.

Over the course of 1948, the Oorlogsvrijwilligers were demobilized - except for one battalion that the Dutch army command thought it needed for Operation Kraai, which was to be completed at the end of 1948. This battalion was only able to leave service in 1949. Not all OVW staff were repatriated. Some chose to extend their employment and others emigrated to Australia or New Zealand.

Notable Oorlogsvrijwilligers
  (1904–1977), military attaché
  (1910–1965), independent politician and mayor
  (1917–1992), resistance fighter during World War II
  (1918–2006), visual artist
  (1919–2002), resistance fighter during World War II, surgeon, and medical historian
 Ted Meines (1921–2016), resistance fighter during World War II and veterans' rights activist
  (1922–1989), resistance fighter during World War II and financial manager
  (1923–2015), resistance fighter during World War II and military historian
  (1923–2000), Knight of the Military Order of William for actions in East Java on 2 May 1946
  (1924–2017), resistance fighter during World War II
 Willem Oltmans (1925–2004), resistance fighter during World War II, author, and investigative journalist
  (1925–2017), state secretary and director of Douwe Egberts and Heineken
  (1925–1966), Reformed Political Party politician and mayor

See also
 Friesland Battalion

References

Dutch East Indies
Indonesian National Revolution
Netherlands Armed Forces
Volunteer military units and formations